There is another Mile Hill nearby which is a Marilyn
Mile Hill is located in Angus, Scotland, 1000 metres west of Dykehead.  It is a circular hill rising 321 metres above sea level between Glen Clova and Glen Prosen.

References

Mountains and hills of Angus, Scotland